Sonny Parker may refer to:

Sonny Parker (musician) (1925–1957), American jazz and blues musician
Sonny Parker (basketball) (born 1955), American former basketball player
Sonny Parker (rugby union) (born 1977), Welsh international rugby player
Sonny Parker (footballer) (born 1983), English footballer who played for Bristol Rovers